Many crop plants are known as peas, particularly
 Pisum sativum
 pea
 marrowfat pea
 snap pea
 snow pea
 split pea

and:
 chick pea, Cicer arietinum
 cow pea, Vigna unguiculata
 black-eyed pea, Vigna unguiculata subsp. unguiculata
 earth pea, Vigna subterranea
 several species of Lathyrus, including:
 sweet pea, Lathyrus odoratus
 pigeon pea, Cajanus cajan

See also
 Pea flower
 Pea flour
 Peanut or goober peas